Petronilla of Aquitaine ( 1125 – c.1151) was a French noble. She was the second daughter of William X of Aquitaine and Aenor of Châtellerault.  She was the elder sister of William Aigret and the younger sister of Eleanor of Aquitaine, who was Queen consort of France, later England. She is variously called Alix (or Aelith in Occitan) and Petronilla; she typically went by Alix after her marriage, while Petronilla seems to have been her childhood name (she is referred to as such in her father's will).

Life
Petronilla accompanied her sister to the French court, where she met Count Raoul I of Vermandois, who was a married man and a cousin to her brother-in-law Louis VII of France. He repudiated his wife and married her, and they were excommunicated by  Pope Innocent II in 1142.  Hostilities flared, and  Louis VII infamously burned Vitry-le-François. Pope Eugenius III renewed the excommunication in 1145, but eventually lifted it at the Council of Reims in 1148.  

The exact date of Petronilla's death is unknown, although she must have died at some point between the Council of Reims in 1148 and 1152 when Raoul was married for a third time to Laure, daughter of Thierry of Alsace, count of Flanders. Petronilla was buried in the Cluniac priory of Saint-Arnoul in Crépy-en-Valois, where Raoul was later interred alongside her.

Issue
Together Raoul and Petronilla had three children:

Elisabeth, Countess of Vermandois also known as Isabelle Mabile (1143 – 28 March 1183), married Philip, Count of Flanders.
Ralph II, Count of Vermandois (1145–1167), married Margaret I, Countess of Flanders.
Eleanor, Countess of Vermandois (1148/49 – 1213), married four times.

In fiction and literature
Petronilla is a main character in several novels that deal with her sister's life, including:
Elizabeth Chadwick - The Summer Queen (2014) 
Cecelia Holland - The Secret Eleanor (2010)
Sharon Penman  
Time and Chance (2002) 
Devil's Brood (2009) 
Alison Weir – The Captive Queen

References

 Kerrebrouck, Patrick van (2000). Les Capétiens 987–1328.

1120s births
1151 deaths
12th-century French nobility
People temporarily excommunicated by the Catholic Church
12th-century French women